The Southern Theater Command is one of the five theater commands of the People's Liberation Army, founded on 1 February 2016. Its predecessor was the Guangzhou Military Region.

Its jurisdiction includes Guangdong, Guangxi, Hunan, Yunnan, Hainan and the South Sea Fleet, as well as the Special Administrative Regions of Hong Kong and Macau.

Its commander is General Wang Xiubin and its political commissar is General Wang Jianwu.

Area of responsibility
Southern Theater Command's area of responsibility (AOR) includes Myanmar, Laos, Vietnam (Mainland Southeast Asia) and the South China Sea. The command's primary missions are maintaining security in the South China Sea and likely supporting the Eastern Theater Command in any major amphibious operation against Taiwan.

Organizational structure 
The Southern Theater Command consists of the following components:

 Southern Theater Command Ground Force
 74th Group Army
 1st Amphibious Combined Arms Brigade
 125th Amphibious Combined Arms Brigade
 132rd Light Combined Arms Brigade
 163rd Light Combined Arms Brigade
 154th Medium Combined Arms Brigade
 16th Heavy Combined Arms Brigade
 74th Special Operations Brigade
 74th Army Aviation Brigade
 74th Artillery Brigade
 74th Air Defense Brigade
 74th Engineer and Chemical Defense Brigade
 74th Sustainment Brigade
 75th Group Army
 32nd Mountain Combined Arms Brigade
 37th Light Combined Arms Brigade
 42nd Light Combined Arms Brigade
 122nd Medium Combined Arms Brigade
 31st Heavy Combined Arms Brigade
 123rd Heavy Combined Arms Brigade
 121st Air Assault Brigade
 75th Special Operation Brigade
 75th Artillery Brigade
 75th Air Defense Brigade
 75th Engineer and Chemical Defense Brigade
 75th Sustainment Brigade
 Southern Theater Command Navy (South Sea Fleet)
 2nd Destroyer Detachment
 9th Destroyer Detachment
 17th Frigate Detachment
 18th Frigate Detachment
 19th Frigate Detachment
 32nd Submarine Detachment
 52nd Submarine Detachment
 6th Landing Ship Detachment
 3rd Combat Support Ship Detachment
 Danger and Lifesaver Detachment
 Southern Theater Command Air Force
 2nd Independent Regiment
 2nd Fighter Division
 8th Bomber Division
 9th Fighter Division
 13th Transport Division
 18th Fighter Division
 42nd Fighter Division

See also 
Southern Theater Command Ground Force
Southern Theater Command Air Force
Southern Theater Command Navy
Hong Kong Garrison
Macao Garrison

References 

 
Theater commands of the People's Liberation Army
Military units and formations established in 2016
2016 establishments in China
Military of Guangdong
Military of Guangxi
Military of Hainan
Military of Guizhou
Military of Hunan
Military of Hong Kong
Military of Yunnan